Davallia canariensis, the hare's-foot fern, is a species of fern in the family Davalliaceae. It is endemic to Macaronesia and the Iberian Peninsula. It grows well in a sunny atmosphere and amongst rocks.

Description

Distribution and habitat
Davallia canariensis is found on the western Mediterranean Basin, from Cape Verde, the Canary Islands and Madeira to Morocco and the western Iberian Peninsula (western Portugal and northwest and southwest Spain). The Latin specific epithet canariensis means "from the Canary Islands".

However, it may be placed outside in a sheltered spot during the summer months. It has an Award of Garden Merit from the Royal Horticultural Society.

References

External links

 American Horticultural Society Encyclopedia of Plants and Flowers (2011), 
 John Garrett, James William Helenus Trail (1901) The illustrated dictionary of gardening: Volume 1

Davalliaceae
Ferns of Africa
Flora of Macaronesia
Flora of the Canary Islands
Flora of Spain
Flora of Portugal
Plants described in 1753
Taxa named by Carl Linnaeus
Taxobox binomials not recognized by IUCN